Hajjiabad-e Arabha (also Romanized as Hājjīābād-e ‘Arabha; also known as Hājīābād-e ‘Arab, Ḩājjīābād, and Hājīābād) is a village in Behnamarab-e Jonubi Rural District, Javadabad District, Varamin County, Tehran Province, Iran. At the 2006 census, its population was 212, in 53 families.

References 

Populated places in Varamin County